Uxbridge Secondary School (U.S.S.) is the only high school in the Township of Uxbridge, Ontario, and is one of 21 high schools within the Durham District School Board. The school has students in grades 9–12 and offers a wide range of academic and extracurricular activities.

History and development 
Originally called Uxbridge High School opened in 1872 opposite the then Methodist and now Trinity United Church on First Avenue. The school replaced the Grammar School that opened in 1856. The second school building was erected from 1923 to 1925 and has undergone five major additions since then in 1965, 1979, 1985, 2003, and 2013.  The building as it stands today has 81 classrooms, two gymnasiums, a cafeteria, library, and numerous staff and maintenance areas.  At one point, there were 13 portables on site, including a "portapack", but these have largely been replaced with a new extension to the school.  As of September 2016, Uxbridge Secondary School (USS) has a student population of 1020 along with 84 teaching and support staff.

Athletics 
The Uxbridge Tigers are well known in Ontario for their success in athletics, specifically Cross-country running and rugby. In 2011, the senior boys won gold at the  "AAAA" OFSAA rugby final. During the 2013 OFSAA cross country Finals, the senior girls placed first, achieving a gold medal. 2015-2016 Senior Boys Rugby 15's "AAA" OFSAA champions. 2015-2016 Senior Girls Volleyball "AAA" OFSAA champions. 2015-2016 Senior Boys Volleyball "AAA" OFSAA consolation champions.

See also
List of high schools in Ontario

References

External links 
 Uxbridge Secondary School

High schools in the Regional Municipality of Durham
1872 establishments in Ontario
Educational institutions established in 1872